Sheikh Ahmed Mohamed Islaam Madobe is the President of the Jubaland State of Somalia.

Background

Islamic Courts Union
As a member of Islamic Courts Union (ICU) Madobe was governor of Jubaland, in 2006. When the ICU was overthrown by Ethiopian National Defense Force he fled towards the Kenyan border when he was wounded, and later received medical treatment at an Ethiopian hospital.

He was later arrested by the Ethiopians. When the Somali parliament expanded to 550 MPs he was elected as an MP in January 2009 and released from  the Ethiopian prison. On 4 April 2009 he announced his resignation from the parliament.

Jubaland presidency
On 15 May 2013, Madobe was elected president of Somalia's southern Jubaland region.

Somali Federal Government contention over election

The government of Jubaland, the Independent Election Committee of Jubaland and the Jubaland electorate, the federal constitution and the state constitution recognized Madobe as the legitimate president of Jubaland. The Somali Federal Government, in violation of both federal and state constitutions, recognised Madobe only as interim president.

National Reconciliation Agreement

On 28 August 2013, Madobe signed a national reconciliation agreement in Addis Ababa with the Somali federal government. Endorsed by the federal State Minister for the Presidency Farah Abdulkadir on behalf of President Hassan Sheikh Mohamud, the pact was brokered by the Foreign Ministry of Ethiopia and came after protracted bilateral talks.

Under the terms of the agreement, for a two-year period Jubaland would be administered by a Juba Interim Administration and led by the region's incumbent president, Madobe. The regional president would serve as the chairperson of a new Executive Council, to which he would appoint three deputies. Management of Kismayo's seaport and airport would also be transferred to the Federal Government after a period of six months, and revenues and resources generated from these infrastructures would be earmarked for Jubaland's service delivery and security sectors as well as local institutional development.

Additionally, the agreement included the integration of Jubaland's military forces under the central command of the Somali National Army (SNA), and stipulated that the Juba Interim Administration would command the regional police. UN Special Envoy to Somalia Nicholas Kay hailed the pact as "a breakthrough that unlocks the door for a better future for Somalia," with AUC, UN, EU and IGAD representatives also present at the signing.

2015 election

On 15 August 2015 Madobe was re-elected by Jubaland parliament with 68 votes as President of Jubaland State. 

Madobe controversially won the elections of 2019 with no significant opponent. opposition has said Ahmed was undemocratic during his previous term commission of working to skew results in his favour 

In August 2019 Madobe was  sworn into office for four years. Ahmed won more than two-thirds of the votes cast by the semi-autonomous region's lawmakers in the port city of Kismayu.

The United Nations had called on all stakeholders to hold a “single electoral process that is credible, inclusive, fair and peaceful", but nevertheless the Federal Government of Somali boycotted the election backing a loyalist in a parallel election.

Tensions between FGS and Jubaland State escalated in March, when heavy fighting broke out near the Kenyan border between Somali troops and Jubaland forces. Kenya also accused FGS of violating its territorial integrity.

The FGS faced criticism from observers for engaging in political feuds with federal states to gain control in the upcoming election, rather than focusing on the fight against Islamist group Al-Shabaab. In June 2020 the FGS recognised Madobe, but only as 'interim' President of Jubaland State with a two-year mandate, contrary to the Jubaland State constitution which provides for a four-year mandate.

References

Jubaland
Living people
Ethnic Somali people
Presidents of Jubaland
1951 births